KWRE (730 AM) is a commercial radio station that is licensed to Warrenton, Missouri. The station serves mainly the western portion of the Greater St. Louis metropolitan area including Warren, St. Charles, Lincoln, Franklin, and parts of St. Louis counties. The station also serves the eastern portion of Mid-Missouri. KWRE also broadcasts on 95.1 on the FM dial via translator K236CK. The radio station is the sister station of KFAV. Both KFAV and KWRE play country music. KWRE is required to reduce power to 120 watts at night to protect other stations on the same channel. It uses a non-directional antenna at all times.

References

External links

WRE
Country radio stations in the United States
Radio stations established in 1949
1949 establishments in Missouri
WRE